La Chapelle-Thireuil is a former commune in the Deux-Sèvres department in the Nouvelle-Aquitaine region in western France. On 1 January 2019, it was merged into the new commune of Beugnon-Thireuil.

See also
Communes of the Deux-Sèvres department

References

External links
 Official Website  [archive]

Former communes of Deux-Sèvres
Populated places disestablished in 2019